Enseruda is a rural locality (a selo) in Tlogobsky Selsoviet, Gunibsky District, Republic of Dagestan, Russia. The population was 42 as of 2010.

Geography 
Enseruda is located 46 km northwest of Gunib (the district's administrative centre) by road, on the Kudiyabor River. Chonob and Khamagib are the nearest rural localities.

Nationalities 
Avars live there.

References 

Rural localities in Gunibsky District